Hardcore Homecoming was a series of professional wrestling events which were advertised as a reunion of talent from the defunct Extreme Championship Wrestling promotion. The tour was booked and promoted by Cody Michaels, Shane Douglas (a former ECW World Heavyweight Champion) and Jeremy Borash in 2005. The event footage was released on DVD with a companion documentary of ECW's history called Forever Hardcore.

History
The inaugural Hardcore Homecoming event was held from 8:00pm to 11:55pm on June 10, 2005, at the Alhambra Arena, formerly known unofficially as the ECW Arena, in South Philadelphia; this was two days before the WWE produced/promoted ECW One Night Stand 2005 reunion show in New York City. The show was preceded by a fan tailgate party in front of the former ECW Arena, with several wrestlers in attendance. This was reminiscent of territorial wrestling in the 1980s, when many independent promotions would hold barbecues before and after the event.

No former ECW performers under contract to WWE appeared at the event (nor would they appear at any of the other three Hardcore Homecoming events which soon followed). However, Mick Foley, a retired worker who wasn't under contract to WWE at the time, made an unannounced appearance. Former ECW ring announcers Bob Artese (referred to in the DVD's on-screen graphics as "Bob Ortiz") and Stephen DeAngelis worked the event, as did former ECW referees John Finnegan, Mike Kehner and John "Pee Wee" Moore and former ECW timekeeper Rocco Musciano.

Following the success of the inaugural event, Hardcore Homecoming launched an "Extreme Reunion Tour" in the month of September. Originally, the tour was to consist of three shows, but the September 17 show in Buffalo was canceled just days before the tour began; it is believed that the promoter was unaware that he needed a promoter's license to run a show in New York. However, the tour did continue with two shows, and it would return to Philadelphia on November 5 (billed as November Reign) for what Tod Gordon has said will stand as the final Hardcore Homecoming show.  However, at an ECW reunion convention, Douglas announced that Hardcore Homecoming would return, first with a 'November to Remember' card in 2009 which would later be renamed Legends of the Arena and took place on June 27, 2009.

Results

An Extreme Reunion
June 10, 2005, from the former ECW Arena in Philadelphia, Pennsylvania

Tod Gordon and Hat Guy are introduced to the crowd
Introduction: Joey Styles, Joel Gertner and Cyrus

Results 

Also: Tribute to the Fallen Heroes of Hardcore: Johnny Grunge (former tag team partner of Rocco Rock), Pitbull #1 (former tag team partner of Pitbull #2) and Tammy Lynn Sytch (widow of Chris Candido) deliver a eulogy. They are interrupted by Danny Doring and Roadkill, who are then chokeslammed by 911)Note: There was no referee. This match was originally supposed to be The Eliminators vs. The Bad Breed, but Perry Saturn was injured.

Extreme Reunion Tour - Night 1
September 16, 2005, from the Agora Theatre in Cleveland, Ohio

 Results 

Extreme Reunion Tour - Night 2
September 17, 2005, from the Golden Dome in Monaca, Pennsylvania

 Results 

November Reign
November 5, 2005, from the former ECW Arena in Philadelphia, Pennsylvania

 Results 

Also: Tod Gordon inducted Terry Funk into the Hardcore Hall of Fame.
This match was not featured on DVD due to copyright reasons due to the Dudleys joining TNA.

Forever HardcoreForever Hardcore is a professional wrestling documentary that interviews wrestlers who participated on June 10, 2005 Hardcore Homecoming show. It was produced by Big Vision Entertainment and Former TNA booker Jeremy Borash and can be seen as a counterpoint to the WWE documentary The Rise and Fall of ECW.

It is particularly noteworthy for the interviews with Shane Douglas, Sandman, and Raven, wrestlers who were integral to the history of ECW but who were not featured on The Rise and Fall of ECW because they weren't under contract to WWE. It also featured another ECW alumnus Sabu in what was at the time a rare speaking role. Also, in the film, New Jack admits to attempting to kill Vic Grimes in the rematch to their notorious scaffold match.

The two disc set also includes bonus matches from former ECW wrestlers who competed in the now-defunct XPW. It was also released on April 30, 2007 for sale in Europe on region 2 DVD.

Home video
Unlike One Night Stand 2005, the June 10, 2005 Hardcore Homecoming event was not broadcast on pay-per-view. A two-disc DVD set of the show was released in August 2005 through the promotion's website, and Big Vision Entertainment later released a "Platinum Edition" of the event commercially, coinciding with the commercial release of Forever Hardcore''. The broadcast was released in Europe on Region 2 DVD on April 30, 2007. Joey Styles was present at the event and provided play-by-play for the DVD release.

The second (and final) Philadelphia show from November 2005 was released in early 2006, with a Platinum Edition of it released by Big Vision Entertainment in May 2006. Buck Woodward and Eric Gargiulo were both present at the November 5, 2005 event and provided play-by-play and color commentary for the show's webcast and DVD release. The Platinum Edition does not feature the Sabu/Funk vs. Team 3D match, as Team 3D's contract with Total Nonstop Action Wrestling prohibits them from appearing on non-TNA video releases. However, the Platinum Edition does feature many bonus matches from independent shows in the early 1990s, XPW and matches from the second show on Hardcore Homecoming's reunion tour. A bootleg edition of this event featuring the Sabu/Funk vs. Team 3D match can be purchased from RF Video and Highspots.com.

Footage of both shows from the Reunion tour were released later in 2005, as the entire Cleveland show was released through the promotion's website, as well as through former ECW videographer RF Video. Despite being advertised for future release, the Monaca show has yet to be released in its entirety. However, 4 of the 6 matches from the show were released as bonus features on the commercially released 'November Reign' DVD, with the Dog-Collar and Stairway to Hell matches being omitted from inclusion.

See also
List of independent wrestling promotions in the United States

References

External links
2300 Arena

Professional wrestling shows
Professional wrestling in Pennsylvania
American independent professional wrestling promotions based in Pennsylvania
Events in Philadelphia
Extreme Championship Wrestling reunions and revivals
Events in Cleveland
2005 in professional wrestling
2005 in Pennsylvania
2005 in Ohio
Professional wrestling in Cleveland